The acronyms Gtg, GTG, gtg, or G2G can refer to:

Engineering, science and technology 
 Grantsburg Municipal Airport (IATA code)
 Gauge theory gravity, a theory of gravitation
 Geophysical Tomography Group, of the Institut de Physique du Globe de Paris 
 A codon in the DNA codon table for the amino acid valine
 G2G, government to government, in e-governance

Media 
 G2G (TV series)